Events in the year 1954 in the Republic of India.

Incumbents
 President of India – Rajendra Prasad
 Prime Minister of India – Jawaharlal Nehru
 Vice President of India – Sarvepalli Radhakrishnan
 Chief Justice of India – 
 until 3 Jan. – M. Patanjali Sastri 
 4 Jan.-22 Dec. – Mehr Chand Mahajan 
 starting 23 Dec. – Bijan Kumar Mukherjea

Governors
 Andhra Pradesh – Chandulal Madhavlal Trivedi
 Assam – Jairamdas Daulatram
 Bihar – Madhav Shrihari Aney
 Maharashtra – Raja Sir Maharaj Singh
 Odisha – Fazal Ali (until 9 February), P. S. Kumaraswamy Raja (starting 9 February)
 Punjab – Chandulal Madhavlal Trivedi
 Rajasthan – Maharaj Man Singh II
 Uttar Pradesh – Hormasji Peroshaw Mody
 West Bengal – Harendra Coomar Mookerjee

Events
 National income - 109,771 million
 22 March – Jayendra Saraswathi becomes the 70th Shankaracharya of Kanchi.
 11 August – Indian annexation of Dadra and Nagar Haveli: Portuguese forces surrender to the Indian SRP.
 6 November – Bombay Electricity Board is formed.
 26 January – First Bharat Ratna in India :
First recipient: C Rajagopalachari
Second recipient: Dr.S Radhakrishnan
Third recipient: C V Raman
4 April – Congress Working Committee set up a subcommittee under Jawaharlal Nehru's chairmanship to examine the working of the Constitution of India.

Law
 5 July – The Andhra Pradesh High Court is established.

Births
11 January – Kailash Satyarthi, Social Reformer, Co-recipient of Nobel Peace Prize 2014. 
7 March – Anupam Kher, actor.
19 March – Indu Shahani, educationist and Sheriff of Mumbai.
12 May – Edappadi K. Palaniswami, chief minister of Tamil Nadu 2018.
4 July  Manjula Vijayakumar, actress (died 2013). 
10 July – Malyadri Sriram, politician and member of parliament from Bapatla.
14 July  R. Sarathkumar, actor and politician.
1 August  Baba Gurinder Singh, Fifth and Present Satguru of Radha Soami Satsang Beas.
11 August – Yashpal Sharma, cricketer (died 2021).
14 September – Shrikant Jichkar, politician (died 2004).
15 September  P. Vasu, film director and actor.
3 October  Sathyaraj, actor, producer and director.
3 November – Laxmikant Berde, comic actor (died 2004).
7 November – Kamal Haasan, actor and film director.
9 November – Shankar Nag, actor and director (died 1990).

Deaths
22 October – Jibanananda Das, poet, writer, novelist and essayist in Bengali (b. 1899)
5 December – Sir Girija Shankar Bajpai, civil servant, diplomat and Governor of Bombay (b. 1891)

See also 
 List of Bollywood films of 1954

References

 
India
Years of the 20th century in India